Walter Nausch (5 February 1907 – 11 July 1957) was an Austrian footballer, who later became a football manager. The captain of legendary Austrian "Wunderteam", Nausch was a versatile player who played in almost all positions on the pitch but was mainly a left wing half. He was known for his great physical condition, versatility, and tactical awareness.

Playing career

Club career
Nausch played for FK Austria Wien between 1923–25 and 1929–38, interspersed with a spell at Wiener AC.

Nausch was chosen in Austria's Team of the Century in 2001.

International career
He made his debut for Austria in October 1929 against Switzerland but missed out on the 1934 FIFA World Cup. He earned 39 caps, scoring one goal.

Coaching career
He worked later as a football coach with Young Fellows Zürich (1940–1948), the Austria national football team (1948–1954) and Austria Wien.

Death
Nausch died of a heart attack in the morning on 11 July 1957 in Obertraun (Upper Austria), where he did spend in the so-called "Sportschule" (a training centre for football). See also "Arbeiterzeitung Wien/Vienna" from July 12, 1957, page 8).

References

1907 births
1957 deaths
Austrian footballers
Austria international footballers
FK Austria Wien players
Austrian football managers
SC Young Fellows Juventus managers
Austria national football team managers
FK Austria Wien managers
1954 FIFA World Cup managers
Footballers from Vienna
Association football defenders
Burials at Ottakring Cemetery